Samuel Bigler (born January 20, 1947) is an American weightlifter. He competed in the men's light heavyweight event at the 1976 Summer Olympics.

References

External links
 

1947 births
Living people
American male weightlifters
Olympic weightlifters of the United States
Weightlifters at the 1976 Summer Olympics
People from Columbia, Pennsylvania
20th-century American people
21st-century American people